Bowmanstead is a village in Cumbria, England.
It is situated 1 mile to the south of Coniston and contains a Catholic church and a pub - The Ship Inn, it is located next to Haws Bank.

To the west of Bowmanstead lies the old Coniston to Foxfield railway line, which is now a footpath leading to the village of Coniston in the north and Torver in the south.

External links

Villages in Cumbria
South Lakeland District